Foster's Home for Imaginary Friends (also known as Foster's Home, or simply Foster's for short) is an American animated television series created by Craig McCracken for Cartoon Network. It was produced by Cartoon Network Studios as the network's first show animated primarily with Adobe Flash, which was done in Ireland by Boulder Media. Set in a world in which imaginary friends coexist with humans, it centers on a boy named Mac who is pressured by his mother to abandon his imaginary friend Bloo. After the duo discover an orphanage dedicated to housing abandoned imaginary friends, Bloo moves into the home and is kept from adoption as long as Mac visits him every day at exactly 3:00 PM. The episodes revolve around Mac and Bloo as they interact with other imaginary friends and house staff and live out their day-to-day adventures, often getting caught up in various predicaments.

McCracken conceived the series with his partner Lauren Faust after they adopted two dogs from an animal shelter and applied the concept to imaginary friends. The series first premiered on Cartoon Network on August 13, 2004, as a 90-minute television film. On August 20, it began its normal run of 20-30-minute episodes on the Fridays block. The series finished its run on May 3, 2009, with a total of 6 seasons and 79 episodes. McCracken left Cartoon Network shortly after the series ended.

Foster's Home for Imaginary Friends became one of Cartoon Network's most successful original series and received critical acclaim and industry accolades, including 5 Annie Awards and 7 Emmy Awards, winning a total of 12 awards out of 35 nominations. It has since been named by Entertainment Weekly as one of the best Cartoon Network shows and by IGN in their list of best animated series at number 85.

A reboot series was announced on July 18, 2022, produced by Hanna-Barbera Studios Europe with Craig McCracken returning as the creator. The reboot, aimed at a preschool audience, will feature a new cast of imaginary friends.

Premise
Foster's Home for Imaginary Friends is set in a universe in which childhood imaginary friends take physical form and become real as soon as children imagine them. Once children outgrow them, friends are relocated to the titular orphanage, where they stay until other children adopt them. The home is run by the elderly Madame Foster, its lovable, kind founder; her rabbit imaginary friend Mr. Herriman, the strict rule-abider and business manager; and her granddaughter Frankie, who handles day-to-day operations.

Because his mother believes he is too old for imaginary friends, eight-year-old Mac is pressured by her to abandon his imaginary friend, Bloo. When Mac takes Bloo to Foster's after seeing a television advertisement, they discover that if Bloo were to live there, he would be available to be adopted by another child. Mac then bargains with Frankie, Herriman, and Madame Foster until they agree to guard Bloo from adoption so long as Mac continues to visit the center daily. Mac continues to visit the home every day after school to experience the escapades of the mischievous Bloo and the array of eccentric, colorful characters inhabiting Foster's and the obstacles with which they are challenged.

Characters

Main
 Mac (voiced by Sean Marquette) – A bright, and imaginative 8-year-old boy who is Bloo's creator and best friend. Mac visits Foster's every day. He is very attached to Bloo and his biggest fear is never seeing him again. Mac is often the voice of reason among his friends when they are making decisions. Mac becomes extremely high and hyperactive when he eats sugar. He also is attracted to Frankie.
 Bloo (voiced by Keith Ferguson) – Mac's imaginary best friend. Bloo is a blue, supple, domed cylinder not unlike a bollard with two eyes. He is often self-centered and egotistical, with a knack for getting in trouble. Despite all this, Bloo apologizes for his actions. He loves paddle balls and claims to be the best at them, despite not making the ball hit the paddle.
 Wilt (voiced by Phil LaMarr) – A very tall, friendly and incredibly nice red-colored friend with only a right arm and a crooked left eye-stalk. His overtly passive demeanor is often taken advantage of by the other imaginary friends. He is a basketball player and fan, and is the former imaginary friend of Jordan Michaels (a parody of Michael Jordan). Wilt's left arm got crushed during a basketball game where he saved Jordan from getting hurt, and a ball hit the back of his left eye after the final point was scored that cost them the game, permanently leaving the eye-stalk crooked. Fearing the latter would be disappointed by how they lost, he leaves Jordan. 3 decades later, Wilt goes on a search to re-encounter him, learning he felt guilty over his imaginary friend's injuries and was grateful to have been saved.
 Eduardo (voiced by Tom Kenny) – A Latin American monster created by a young girl, Nina Valerosa, to protect her in a dangerous neighborhood. Eduardo is big, hairy and violet-purple sloth who has horns, a snout, a pointy demon-like tail, and large teeth. Despite his large size, overwhelming strength, and menacing appearance, Eduardo is docile, timid and scared of almost anything. However, he can be ferocious if angered or when danger befalls his friends.
 Coco (voiced by Candi Milo) – A chicken-like bird with palm tree-like hair who can only say or write her name. She has the ability to lay colorful, plastic eggs containing a plethora of objects, at will. Other characters usually understand her when she speaks. Despite her appearance and behavior, she can demonstrate intelligence and kindness. Her creator is unknown, as she was found on a South Pacific island by two scientists named Adam and Douglas.
 Frances "Frankie" Foster (voiced by Grey DeLisle) – Madame Foster's 22-year-old redheaded granddaughter who is referred to as "Miss Frances" by Mr. Herriman. Frankie is the caregiver at Foster's and helps keep everything in order. She is usually very friendly, capable, easygoing, hard-working, thoughtful, caring, and sweet, but occasionally loses her patience with Bloo and Mr. Herriman. According to her driver's license, she was born on July 25, 1984.
 Mr. Herriman (voiced by Tom Kane) – A gray and white elderly anthropomorphic lop ear rabbit friend imagined by Madame Foster who also speaks with a British accent. He wears a tailcoat, white gloves, a top hat, and a monocle. He presents himself as head of business affairs of the house and later as President of the house, and is extremely strict about rules and the maintenance of order in the home. He frequently punishes Bloo for his various misdemeanors and scolds Frankie for her perceived laziness, despite all her hard work.
 Madame Foster (voiced by Candi Milo) – The caring founder of Foster's and grandmother of Frankie. She is the creator of Mr. Herriman. Despite being elderly, Madame Foster has childlike boundless energy and occasionally becomes hyperactive and mischievous.

Other recurring characters include Terrence (voiced by Tara Strong), Mac's older brother who constantly bullies him; Duchess (also voiced by Grey DeLisle), a friend with a Cubist-looking face and a pompous, narcissistic personality; Cheese (also voiced by Candi Milo), a dim-witted and childish yellow friend who first appeared in season two; and Goo (also voiced by Grey DeLisle), a talkative young girl who is highly imaginative and constantly creates new friends, first appearing in season three.

Episodes

The show has 79 episodes in 6 seasons; it has also aired 18 shorts.

Production

The series was created by Craig McCracken, who had also created The Powerpuff Girls for Cartoon Network. McCracken developed the idea for the series after adopting two dogs from an animal shelter with his then-fiancée Lauren Faust and Mike Moon; he adapted the concept of pet adoption to that of imaginary friends. The show has an art style which is meant to evoke, according to McCracken, "that period of late 60's psychedelia when Victorian stylings were coming into trippy poster designs". McCracken wanted Foster's to be similar to The Muppet Show, which he believed was a "fun, character driven show that the whole family could enjoy".

Animation for the show was done using a process involving Adobe software Illustrator, Flash and After Effects. McCracken directed, executive produced and story edited the series. Most of the episodes were produced at the Cartoon Network Studios in Burbank, California, while the rest were produced at Boulder Media Limited in Dublin, Ireland. The theme song was composed by James L. Venable, who had originally collaborated with McCracken on The Powerpuff Girls. Craig described the music as "psychedelic ragtime". Additional music was composed by Venable and Jennifer Kes Remington.

Collette Sunderman was the casting and recording director for the show. Sean Marquette was cast as Mac, and Keith Ferguson was cast as Bloo. The Powerpuff Girls voice actors Tom Kane, Tom Kenny and Tara Strong were cast in Foster's as Mr. Herriman, Eduardo and Terrence, respectively. Grey DeLisle was cast as Frankie Foster, Phil LaMarr was cast as Wilt, and Candi Milo was cast as Coco and Madame Foster. From season two onwards, Milo also lent her voice to Cheese. DeLisle also voiced Goo after the character's debut in season three.

Foster's Home for Imaginary Friends premiered on August 13, 2004, as a 90-minute special titled "House of Bloo's". The series' run began on August 20 on its normal timeslot of Fridays at 7:00 PM. The special was Cartoon Network's highest rated premiere at the time. 18 shorts were produced from 2006 to 2007. In addition to the premiere episode, two other specials were produced: "Good Wilt Hunting", which premiered on November 23, 2006, and "Destination: Imagination", which premiered on November 27, 2008. The final episode, titled "Goodbye to Bloo", aired on May 3, 2009, preceded by a 6-hour marathon of other episodes from the series. McCracken expressed a certain sadness at the series' end, but stated that he was "crazy proud of the work" that he and the production team had done "on Foster's and the fact that it worked just the way [they] wanted it to". During its original run, Foster's was one of Cartoon Network's highest rated shows. The show proved to be popular among both younger and older audiences.

Reception

Critical response
Anita Gates of The New York Times praised the series' premiere -hour episode and stated that the series would promise to be an "admirable tale of loyalty and adventure-based learning with a contagious sense of fun". Mike Pinsky, in a review on DVD Verdict, praised the art design and the characterizations, particularly singling out Cheese as possibly "the quintessence of Foster's surreal charm" in his Season 2 review. David Cornelius of DVD Talk called the series "one of the best shows of any kind [then] on television, a winner for viewers of any age" and "a wildly inventive mix of creative wonder, comic genius, and well-crafted chaos". In a Season 2 review, also on DVD Talk, Cornelius called the show "flat-out perfect". Joly Herman of Common Sense Media, an advocacy group focused on appropriate technology and media for children, was less enthusiastic about the show, rating it 2 stars out of 5. Herman praised the creativity and diversity of the characters and the show's premise, but criticized the storyline and writing, which presented "confusing messages" for young children.

The series was named the 85th best animated series of all time in a list of the top 100 animated series by IGN, which called it very funny and endearing. Entertainment Weekly named the show the sixth best Cartoon Network show in their top 10 list, praising its "catchy magical-realist setting" and the characters "you genuinely learned to care about".

Awards

Foster's Home for Imaginary Friends received many industry accolades. The series received 12 awards out of a total of 35 nominations. At the Annie Awards, the show received a total of 20 nominations from 2004 to 2009, and won 5, including Best Animated Television Production in 2007. At the Emmy Awards, the show received nine nominations, and won seven awards, including five Outstanding Individual Achievements in Animation and one Outstanding Animated Program (For Programming One Hour or More) award. At the 2005 Pulcinella Awards, Foster's received the award for Best TV Series for All Audiences and Bloo was named "Best Character of the Year." At the 22nd TCA Awards, the show received a nomination for Outstanding Achievement in Children's Programming. At the 2007 Ottawa International Animation Festival, the series won Best Television Animation for Children.

Merchandising and media

Video games
There are 2 video games based on Foster's Home for Imaginary Friends. The first has the same name as the show and was developed by Crave Entertainment for the Game Boy Advance. It was released on October 17, 2006. In the game, players control Mac or Bloo while collecting items to complete objectives. Jack Devries of IGN rated it a 5 1/2 out of 10, stating that it "falls short" and is "skippable". The second game, titled Foster's Home for Imaginary Friends: Imagination Invaders, was released on November 12, 2007, for the Nintendo DS by Midway. In the game, the player controls Bloo, who performs tasks and completes quests while fighting against "Space Nut Boogies". Devries rated it 4 out of 10, calling it "terrible to play" and "completely worthless". Characters from the show also appear on the games Cartoon Network: Punch Time Explosion and FusionFall.

On May 15, 2006, Cartoon Network introduced an online game, Big Fat Awesome House Party, which allowed players to create an online friend to join Bloo and the others in a one-year game online, earning points that would give them gifts, cards and other online "merchandise" for their albums. A player's friend, made from one of over 900,000 possible characters, could wind up in a future episode of Foster's. Over 13 million users were registered to play the game after its launch in May 2006. Because of its success and popularity, Cartoon Network announced in May 2007 that the game would continue for six more months, into November of that year.

Promotions and other products
From 2006 to 2008, Cartoon Network made a Foster's Home for Imaginary Friends float as part of the Macy's Thanksgiving Day Parade. The float was fashioned as a replica of the home. On Thanksgiving Day, 2006, characters from the show performed the Beatles' "With a Little Help from My Friends". In 2007, the characters' performance of "You're My Best Friend" by Queen. In 2008, the characters' performance of Harry Nilsson's theme song to The Courtship of Eddie's Father later reused for Rob & Big was interrupted by Rick Astley singing "Never Gonna Give You Up", reproducing the Internet phenomenon of Rickrolling. In 2006, the network promoted the show with billboards that read "I pooted" and "I'm a hot toe picker" (as said by Cheese and Bloo, respectively) in about 25 cities within the United States, one being placed next to Interstate 40/85 through Greensboro, North Carolina. Some time later, one of the "I pooted" billboards (along U.S. Route 29) was taken down due to concerns by the North Carolina A&T State University. An associate of the entity, who claimed the advertisement did not represent their purpose and mission, said that "some people didn't understand if this was something in connection with the university." Both parts came to an agreement, and the billboard was then replaced with one that read "Shiny, shiny. Pretty, pretty", a line from the program My Gym Partner's a Monkey.

In March 2006, toys of characters from the show were featured in Burger King's Kids Meals. In December 2007, Cartoon Network and Hot Topic retail stores in the United States set up a boutique for a product line based on the series, with over 693 locations featuring products such as clothing, accessories and DVD releases by Warner Home Video. The episodes from the series are available for digital purchase on iTunes and Amazon Video, with the exception of the Christmas special. The show's second season was available on Netflix until March 2015. All 6 seasons were added to Hulu in May 2015 until its removal from the service on October 1, 2022. The show is now available to watch on HBO Max as of May 2020.

Home media

References

External links

 
 

 
2000s American animated television series
2000s American comedy-drama television series
2004 American television series debuts
2009 American television series endings
American children's animated adventure television series
American children's animated comedy television series
American children's animated drama television series
American children's animated fantasy television series
American flash animated television series
Animated television series about birds
Animated television series about children
Animated television series about orphans
Cartoon Network original programming
Television series by Cartoon Network Studios
English-language television shows
Television series created by Craig McCracken